This is a list of feature-length films (at least 45 minutes) shown at the New York Film Festival. Films previously released in the U.S. and screened as retrospectives are not included.

Films at the first New York Film Festival (1963) 

Opening Night: The Exterminating Angel (Luis Buñuel, Mexico)
Closing Night: Sweet and Sour (Jacques Baratier, France)
All the Way Home (Alex Segal, USA)
An Autumn Afternoon (Yasujirō Ozu, Japan)
Barravento (Glauber Rocha, Brazil)
Elektra at Epidaurus (Ted Zarpas, Greece)
The Fiances (Ermanno Olmi, Italy)
Glory Sky (Takis Kanellopoulos, Greece)
In the Midst of Life (Robert Enrico, France)
Hallelujah the Hills (Adolfas Mekas, USA)
Harakiri (Masaki Kobayashi, Japan)
Knife in the Water (Roman Polanski, Poland)
Le Joli Mai (Chris Marker, France)
Love in the Suburbs (Tamás Fejér, Hungary)
Magnet of Doom (Jean-Pierre Melville, France)
Muriel, or The Time of Return (Alain Resnais, France)
RoGoPaG (Roberto Rossellini, Ugo Gregoretti, Jean-Luc Godard and Pier Paolo Pasolini, Italy)
The Sea (Giuseppe Patroni Griffi, Italy)
The Servant (Joseph Losey, UK)
The Terrace (Leopoldo Torre Nilsson, Argentina)
The Trial of Joan of Arc (Robert Bresson, France)

Films at the second New York Film Festival (1964) 

Opening Night: Hamlet (Grigori Kozintsev, USSR)
Closing Night: The Big City (Satyajit Ray, India)
Alone Across the Pacific (Kon Ichikawa, Japan)
Band of Outsiders (Jean-Luc Godard, France)
Before the Revolution (Bernardo Bertolucci, Italy)
The Brig (Jonas Mekas & Adolfas Mekas, USA)
Cyrano et d'Artagnan (Abel Gance, France)
Diary of a Chambermaid (Luis Buñuel, France)
Enjō (Kon Ichikawa, Japan)
Fail-Safe (Sidney Lumet, USA)
Hands Over the City (Francesco Rosi, Italy)
The Inheritance (Ricardo Alventosa, Argentina)
King & Country (Joseph Losey, UK)
Life Upside Down (Alain Jessua, France)
Lilith (Robert Rossen, USA)
Nobody Waved Good-bye (Don Owen, Canada)
Nothing but a Man (Michael Roemer, USA)
Passenger (Andrzej Munk, Poland)
Salvatore Giuliano (Francesco Rosi, Italy)
She and He (Susumu Hani, Japan)
Siberian Lady Macbeth (Andrzej Wajda, Poland/Yugoslavia)
Tales of the Taira Clan (Kenji Mizoguchi, Japan)
To Love (Jörn Donner, Sweden)
Woman in the Dunes (Hiroshi Teshigahara, Japan)
A Woman Is a Woman (Jean-Luc Godard, France/Italy, 1961)

Films at the 3rd New York Film Festival (1965) 

Opening Night: Alphaville (Jean-Luc Godard, France)
Closing Night: Red Beard (Akira Kurosawa, Japan)
Black Peter (Miloš Forman, Czechoslovakia)
Charulata (Satyajit Ray, India)
Fists in the Pocket (Marco Bellocchio, Italy)
Gertrud (Carl Theodor Dreyer, Denmark)
Identification Marks: None (Jerzy Skolimowski, Poland)
The Koumiko Mystery (Chris Marker, France)
Mickey One (Arthur Penn, USA)
Not Reconciled (Jean-Marie Straub, West Germany)
Paris vu par... (Claude Chabrol, Jean Douchet, Jean-Luc Godard, Jean-Daniel Pollet, Eric Rohmer and Jean Rouch, France)
Le Petit soldat (Jean-Luc Godard, France)
Raven's End (Bo Widerberg, Sweden)
Sandra (Luchino Visconti, Italy)
Shakespeare Wallah (James Ivory, India)
The Shop on Main Street (Ján Kadár & Elmar Klos, Czechoslovakia)
Sweet Substitute (Larry Kent, Canada)
Thomas the Impostor (Georges Franju, France)
Walkover (Jerzy Skolimowski, Poland)

Films at the 4th New York Film Festival (1966) 

Opening Night: Loves of a Blonde (Miloš Forman, Czechoslovakia)
Closing Night: La guerre est finie (Alain Resnais, France)
Accattone (Pier Paolo Pasolini, Italy)
Almost a Man (Vittorio De Seta, Italy)
Au hasard Balthazar (Robert Bresson, France)
Les Créatures (Agnès Varda, France)
Do You Keep a Lion at Home? (Pavel Hobl, Czechoslovakia)
The Eavesdropper (Leopoldo Torre Nilsson, Argentina)
The Grim Reaper (Bernardo Bertolucci, Italy)
The Hawks and the Sparrows (Pier Paolo Pasolini, Italy)
Hunger (Henning Carlsen, Denmark)
The Hunt (Carlos Saura, Spain)
Intimate Lighting (Ivan Passer, Czechoslovakia)
The Man Who Had His Hair Cut Short (André Delvaux, Belgium)
Masculin Féminin (Jean-Luc Godard, France)
Pearls of the Deep (Jirí Menzel, Jan Nemec, Evald Schorm, Vera Chytilová and Jaromil Jires, Czechoslovakia)
Pierrot le Fou (Jean-Luc Godard, France)
The Round-Up (Miklós Jancsó, Hungary)
Shadows of Forgotten Ancestors (Sergei Parajanov, USSR)
The Shameless Old Lady (René Allio, France)
Simon of the Desert (Luis Buñuel, Mexico)
Three (Aleksandar Petrovic, Yugoslavia)
Troublemakers (Norman Fruchter & Robert Machover, USA)
The War Game (Peter Watkins, UK)

Films at the 5th New York Film Festival (1967) 

Opening Night: The Battle of Algiers (Gillo Pontecorvo, Italy/Algeria)
Closing Night: Far from Vietnam (Jean-Luc Godard, Joris Ivens, William Klein, Claude Lelouch, Chris Marker, Alain Resnais, and Agnès Varda, France)
Barrier (Jerzy Skolimowski, Poland)
Benefit of the Doubt (Peter Whitehead, UK)
Les Carabiniers (Jean-Luc Godard, France)
Le Départ (Jerzy Skolimowski, Belgium)
Elvira Madigan (Bo Widerberg, Sweden)
Father (István Szabó, Hungary)
The Feverish Years (Dragoslav Lazic, Yugoslavia)
Funnyman (John Korty, USA)
Hugs and Kisses (Jonas Cornell, Sweden)
The Lion Hunters (Jean Rouch, France)
Love Affair, or The Case of the Missing Switchboard Operator (Dusan Makavejev, Yugoslavia)
Made in U.S.A. (Jean-Luc Godard, France)
Memorandum (Donald Brittain & John Spotton, Canada)
A Mother's Heart (Mark Donskoy, USSR)
Portrait of Jason (Shirley Clarke, USA)
Samurai Rebellion (Masaki Kobayashi, Japan)
The Taking of Power by Louis XIV (Roberto Rossellini, France)
Tonite Let's All Make Love in London (Peter Whitehead, UK)
L'Une et l'Autre (René Allio, France)
Yesterday Girl (Alexander Kluge, West Germany)
Young Törless (Volker Schlöndorff, West Germany)

Films at the 6th New York Film Festival (1968) 

Opening Night: Capricious Summer (Jirí Menzel, Czechoslovakia)
Closing Night: The Firemen's Ball (Miloš Forman, Czechoslovakia)
Artists Under the Big Top: Perplexed (Alexander Kluge, West Germany)
Beyond the Law (Norman Mailer, USA)
Les Biches (Claude Chabrol, France)
The Chronicle of Anna Magdalena Bach (Jean-Marie Straub & Danièle Huillet, Italy/West Germany)
Faces (John Cassavetes, USA)
Hugo and Josephine (Kjell Grede, Sweden)
The Immortal Story (Orson Welles, France)
Kaya, I'll Kill You (Vatroslav Mimica, Yugoslavia)
Mouchette (Robert Bresson, France)
Naked Childhood (Maurice Pialat, France)
The Nun (Jacques Rivette, France)
Partner. (Bernardo Bertolucci, Italy)
The Red and the White (Miklós Jancsó, Hungary)
A Report on the Party and the Guests (Jan Nemec, Czechoslovakia)
Signs of Life (Werner Herzog, West Germany)
Tropics (Gianni Amico, Italy)
24 Hours in the Life of a Woman (Dominique Delouche, France)
Two or Three Things I Know About Her (Jean-Luc Godard, France)
Week End (Jean-Luc Godard, France)

Films at the 7th New York Film Festival (1969) 

Opening Night: Bob & Carol & Ted & Alice (Paul Mazursky, USA)
Closing Night: Oh! What a Lovely War (Richard Attenborough, UK)
Ådalen 31 (Bo Widerberg, Sweden)
Boy (Nagisa Oshima, Japan)
The Deserter and the Nomads (Juraj Jakubisko, Czechoslovakia)
Destroy, She Said (Marguerite Duras, France)
Duet For Cannibals (Susan Sontag, Sweden)
The Epic That Never Was (Bill Duncalf, UK)
Une femme douce (Robert Bresson, France)
Le Gai Savoir (Jean-Luc Godard, France)
Goto, Island of Love (Walerian Borowczyk, France)
The Joke (Jaromil Jireš, Czechoslovakia)
The Lady from Constantinople (Judit Elek, Hungary)
Lions Love (Agnès Varda, USA)
The Money Order (Ousmane Sembène, Senegal)
My Night at Maud's (Éric Rohmer, France)
One Fine Day (Ermanno Olmi, Italy)
Pierre & Paul (René Allio, France)
Porcile (Pier Paolo Pasolini, Italy)
The Rite (Ingmar Bergman, Sweden)

Films at the 8th New York Film Festival (1970) 

Opening Night: The Wild Child (François Truffaut, France)
Closing Night: Tristana (Luis Buñuel, Italy/France/Spain)
Bleu Shut (Robert Nelson, USA)
Le Boucher (Claude Chabrol, France)
The Cannibals (Liliana Cavani, Italy)
Comrades (Marin Karmitz, France)
The Conformist (Bernardo Bertolucci, Italy)
Days and Nights in the Forest (Satyajit Ray, India)
Double Pisces (Dick Fontaine, UK)
Even Dwarfs Started Small (Werner Herzog, West Germany)
Five Easy Pieces (Bob Rafelson, USA)
From Lumière to Langlois: The French Silent Cinema (Henri Langlois, France)
The Garden of Delights (Carlos Saura, Spain)
Harry Munter (Kjell Grede, Sweden)
The Inheritors (Carlos Diegues, Brazil)
Je t'aime, je t'aime (Alain Resnais, France) 
Kes (Ken Loach, UK) 
Langlois (Elia Hershon & Roberto Guerra)
Mistreatment (Lars Lennart Forsberg, Sweden)
La Musica (Marguerite Duras, France)
Original Cast Album: Company (D. A. Pennebaker, USA)
Othon (Jean-Marie Straub & Danièle Huillet, West Germany) 
Praise Marx and Pass the Ammunition (Maurice Hatton, UK)
The Scavengers (Ermanno Olmi, Italy)
Une simple histoire (Marcel Hanoun, France)
The Spider's Stratagem (Bernardo Bertolucci, Italy)
Street Scenes 1970 (Martin Scorsese, USA)
Wind from the East (Dziga Vertov Group, Italy/France/West Germany) 
Zorns Lemma (Hollis Frampton, USA)

Film at the 9th New York Film Festival (1971) 

Opening Night: The Beginning (Gleb Panfilov, USSR)
Closing Night: Murmur of the Heart (Louis Malle, France)
Bonaparte and the Revolution (Abel Gance, France) 
Born to Win (Ivan Passer, USA)
The Decameron (Pier Paolo Pasolini, Italy)
Directed by John Ford (Peter Bogdanovich, USA) 
Dodes'ka-den (Akira Kurosawa, Japan)
Family Life (Krzysztof Zanussi, Poland)
Fata Morgana (Werner Herzog, West Germany)
Four Nights of a Dreamer (Robert Bresson, France)
In the Name of the Father (Marco Bellocchio, Italy)
In the Summertime (Ermanno Olmi, Italy)
The Last Picture Show (Peter Bogdanovich, USA)
Pioneers in Ingolstadt (Rainer Werner Fassbinder, West Germany) 
Punishment Park (Peter Watkins, USA) 
A Safe Place (Henry Jaglom, USA)
The Sorrow and the Pity (Marcel Ophuls, France) 
W.R.: Mysteries of the Organism (Dusan Makavejev, Yugoslavia)

Films at the 10th New York Film Festival (1972) 

Opening Night: Chloe in the Afternoon (Éric Rohmer, France)
Closing Night: Last Tango in Paris (Bernardo Bertolucci, Italy/France)
The Adversary (Satyajit Ray, India)
L'amour fou (Jacques Rivette, France)
The Assassination of Trotsky (Joseph Losey, Italy/France)
Bad Company (Robert Benton, USA)
Behind the Wall (Krzysztof Zanussi, Poland)
The Discreet Charm of the Bourgeoisie (Luis Buñuel, France)
Family Life (Ken Loach, UK)
Going Home (Adolfas Mekas, USA)
Heat (Paul Morrissey, USA)
Images (Robert Altman, Ireland)
The Inner Scar (Philippe Garrel, France)
The King of Marvin Gardens (Bob Rafelson, USA)
Letter to Jane (Jean-Luc Godard & Jean-Pierre Gorin, France)
Love (Károly Makk, Hungary)
The Merchant of Four Seasons (Rainer Werner Fassbinder, West Germany)
Nathalie Granger (Marguerite Duras, France)
Red Psalm (Miklós Jancsó, Hungary)
Reminiscences of a Journey to Lithuania (Jonas Mekas, USA)
A Sense of Loss (Marcel Ophüls, Switzerland/USA)
Summer Soldiers (Hiroshi Teshigahara, Japan)
Tout va bien (Jean-Luc Godard & Jean-Pierre Gorin, France)
Two English Girls (François Truffaut, France)
We Won't Grow Old Together (Maurice Pialat, France/Italy)

Films at the 11th New York Film Festival (1973) 

Opening Night: Day for Night (François Truffaut, France)
Closing Night: Badlands (Terrence Malick, USA)
Andrei Rublev (Andrei Tarkovsky, USSR) 
The Bitter Tears of Petra von Kant (Rainer Werner Fassbinder, West Germany)
Distant Thunder (Satyajit Ray, India)
A Doll's House (Joseph Losey, UK)
History Lessons (Jean-Marie Straub & Danièle Huillet, West Germany/Italy) 
The Illumination (Krzysztof Zanussi, Poland) 
Israel, Why? (Claude Lanzmann, France)
Just Before Nightfall (Claude Chabrol, France)
Kid Blue (James Frawley, USA)
Land of Silence and Darkness (Werner Herzog, West Germany) 
Mean Streets (Martin Scorsese, USA) 
The Mother and the Whore (Jean Eustache, France) 
Réjeanne Padovani (Denys Arcand, Canada) 
Return (Gianni Amico, Italy) 
La Rupture (Claude Chabrol, France)

Films at the 12th New York Film Festival (1974) 

Opening Night: Don't Cry With Your Mouth Full (Pascal Thomas, France)
Closing Night: The Phantom of Liberty (Luis Buñuel, France)
Ali: Fear Eats the Soul (Rainer Werner Fassbinder, West Germany)
Alice in the Cities (Wim Wenders, West Germany) 
The Bench of Desolation (Claude Chabrol, France) 
A Bigger Splash (Jack Hazan, UK)
Celine and Julie Go Boating (Jacques Rivette, France)
The Circumstance (Ermanno Olmi, Italy)
From These Roots (Bill Greaves, USA)
Italianamerican (Martin Scorsese, USA)
Lacombe, Lucien (Louis Malle, France)
Lancelot du Lac (Robert Bresson, France) 
The Middle of the World (Alain Tanner, Switzerland)
The Night of the Scarecrow (Sérgio Ricardo, Brazil) 
Old-Fashioned Woman (Martha Coolidge, USA)
Out 1: Spectre (Jacques Rivette, France)
La Paloma (Daniel Schmid, Switzerland)
Part-Time Work of a Domestic Slave (Alexander Kluge, West Germany)
Rome Wants Another Caesar (Miklós Jancsó, Hungary)
Stavisky (Alain Resnais, France)
A Woman Under the Influence (John Cassavetes, USA)
Yudie (Mirra Bank, USA)

Films at the 13th New York Film Festival (1975) 

Opening Night: Conversation Piece (Luchino Visconti, Italy)
Closing Night: The Story of Adele H. (François Truffaut, France)
Autobiography of a Princess (James Ivory, UK) 
Black Moon (Louis Malle, France) 
Compañero: Victor Jara of Chile (Stanley Forman & Martin Smith, Chile)
Electra, My Love (Miklós Jancsó, Hungary) 
The Enigma of Kaspar Hauser (Werner Herzog, West Germany)
Exhibition (Jean-François Davy, France)  
F for Fake (Orson Welles, France)  
Fox and His Friends (Rainer Werner Fassbinder, West Germany) 
French Provincial (André Téchiné, France)
Grey Gardens (Albert Maysles & David Mayles & Ellen Hovde & Muffie Meyer, USA)
Hearts of the West (Howard Zieff, USA)
India Song (Marguerite Duras, France) 
The Lost Honour of Katharina Blum (Volker Schlöndorff & Margarethe von Trotta, West Germany) 
Milestones (Robert Kramer & John Douglas, USA)
Moses and Aaron (Jean-Marie Straub & Danièle Huillet, West Germany/France/Italy)
Smile (Michael Ritchie, USA) 
The Wonderful Crook (Claude Goretta, Switzerland) 
Xala (Ousmane Sembène, Senegal)

Films at the 14th New York Film Festival (1976) 

Opening Night: Small Change (François Truffaut, France)
Closing Night: The Marquise of O (Eric Rohmer, West Germany/France)
Bernice Bobs Her Hair (Joan Micklin Silver, USA)
Dersu Uzala (Akira Kurosawa, USSR/Japan)
Duelle (Jacques Rivette, France)
Fear of Fear (Rainer Werner Fassbinder, West Germany)
Harlan County, USA (Barbara Kopple, USA)
Illustrious Corpses (Francesco Rosi, Italy)
Jonah Who Will Be 25 in the Year 2000 (Alain Tanner, Switzerland)
Kings of the Road (Wim Wenders, West Germany)
The Memory of Justice (Marcel Ophuls, USA)
The Middleman (Satyajit Ray, India)
Sérail (Eduardo de Gregorio, France)
The Story of Sin (Walerian Borowczyk, Poland)
Strongman Ferdinand (Alexander Kluge, West Germany)
A Touch of Zen (King Hu, Hong Kong)

Films at the 15th New York Film Festival (1977)  

Opening Night: One Sings, the Other Doesn't (Agnès Varda, France)
Closing Night: That Obscure Object of Desire (Luis Buñuel, France/Spain)
The American Friend (Wim Wenders, West Germany)
Le Camion (Marguerite Duras, France)
Children of Labor (Noel Buckner & Mary Dore & Richard Boardman & Al Gedicks, USA)
Citizens Band (Jonathan Demme, USA)
The Devil, Probably (Robert Bresson, France)
Heart of Glass (Werner Herzog, West Germany)
Hot Tomorrows (Martin Brest, USA)
The Lacemaker (Claude Goretta, France)
The Man Who Loved Women (François Truffaut, France)
Men of Bronze (Bill Miles, USA)
1900 (Bernardo Bertolucci, Italy)
Omar Gatlato (Merzak Allouache, Algeria)
Padre Padrone (Paolo and Vittorio Taviani, Italy)
Pafnucio Santo (Rafael Corkidi, Mexico)
Roseland (James Ivory, USA)
Salò, or The 120 Days of Sodom (Pier Paolo Pasolini, Italy)
Short Eyes (Robert M. Young, USA)
Tent of Miracles (Nelson Pereira dos Santos, Brazil)
Women (Márta Mészáros, Hungary)

Films at the 16th New York Film Festival (1978) 

Opening Night: A Wedding (Robert Altman, USA)
Closing Night: Violette (Claude Chabrol, France)
American Boy: A Profile of Steven Prince (Martin Scorsese, USA)
The Apple Game (Vera Chytilová, Czechoslovakia)
Bloodbrothers (Robert Mulligan, USA)
Camouflage (Krzysztof Zanussi, Poland)
The CIA Case Officer (Saul Landau, USA)
Despair (Rainer Werner Fassbinder, West Germany)
Dossier 51 (Michel Deville, France)
Elective Affinities (Gianni Amico, Italy)
Gates of Heaven (Errol Morris, USA)
Get Out Your Handkerchiefs (Bertrand Blier, France)
The Green Room (François Truffaut, France)
The Left-Handed Woman (Peter Handke, West Germany)
Like a Turtle on Its Back (Luc Béraud, France)
Manimals (Robin Lehman, USA)
The Miracle of the Wolves (1924) (Raymond Bernard, France)
Movies Are My Life (Peter Hayden, USA)
Newsfront (Phillip Noyce, Australia)
Perceval le Gallois (Eric Rohmer, France)
The Shout (Jerzy Skolimowski, Poland)
Skip Tracer (Zale Dalen, Canada)
Spies (1928) (Fritz Lang, Germany)
They Are Their Own Gifts (Lucille Rhodes & Margaret Murphy, USA)
With Babies and Banners: Story of the Women's Emergency Brigade (Lorraine Gray, USA)

Films at the 17th New York Film Festival (1979) 

Opening Night: Luna (Bernardo Bertolucci, Italy/USA)
Closing Night: The Marriage of Maria Braun (Rainer Werner Fassbinder, West Germany)
Alexandria... Why? (Youssef Chahine, Egypt/Algeria)
Angi Vera (Pál Gábor, Hungary)
Best Boy (Ira Wohl, USA)
Black Jack (Ken Loach, UK)
The Black Stallion (Carroll Ballard, USA)
 The Bugs Bunny/Road Runner Movie, (Chuck Jones, USA)
The Europeans (James Ivory, UK)
In a Year of Thirteen Moons (Rainer Werner Fassbinder, West Germany)
The Maids of Wilko (Andrzej Wajda, Poland)
Molière (Ariane Mnouchkine, France)
My Brilliant Career (Gillian Armstrong, Australia)
Nosferatu the Vampyre (Werner Herzog, West Germany)
Other People's Money (Christian de Chalonge, France)
A Scream from Silence (Anne Claire Poirier, Canada)
Short Memory (Eduardo de Gregorio, France)
Wise Blood (John Huston, USA)
Without Anesthesia (Andrzej Wajda, Poland)
The Wobblies (Stewart Bird & Deborah Shaffer, USA)

Films at the 18th New York Film Festival (1980) 

Opening Night: Melvin and Howard (Jonathan Demme, USA)
Closing Night: The Last Metro (François Truffaut, France)
And Quiet Rolls the Dawn (Mrinal Sen, India)
Bye Bye Brazil (Carlos Diegues, Brazil)
Camera Buff (Krzysztof Kieslowski, Poland)
The Color of Pomegranates (Sergei Parajanov, Armenia)
Confidence (István Szabó, Hungary)
The Constant Factor (Krzysztof Zanussi, Poland)
Every Man for Himself (Jean-Luc Godard, France/Switzerland)
Handicapped Love (Marlies Graf, Switzerland)
The Handyman (Micheline Lanctôt, Canada)
Here's Looking at You, Kid (William Edgar Cohen, USA)
Kagemusha (Akira Kurosawa, Japan)
The Life and Times of Rosie the Riveter (Connie Field, USA)
Loulou (Maurice Pialat, France)
Masoch (Franco Brogi Taviani, Italy)
Nights at O'Rear's (Robert Mandel, USA)
The Orchestra Conductor (Andrzej Wajda, Poland)
Rush (Evelyn Purcell, USA)
Special Treatment (Goran Paskaljevic, Yugoslavia)
Sunday Daughters (János Rózsa, Hungary)

Films at the 19th New York Film Festival (1981) 

Opening Night: Chariots of Fire (Hugh Hudson, UK)
Closing Night: Man of Iron (Andrzej Wajda, Poland)
The Aviator's Wife (Éric Rohmer, France)
The Beads of One Rosary (Kazimierz Kutz, Poland)
Beau-père (Bertrand Blier, France)
Contract (Krzysztof Zanussi, Poland)
Documenteur (Agnès Varda, USA)
Fit to Be Untied (Silvano Agosti & Marco Bellocchio & Sandro Petraglia & Stefano Rulli, Italy)
Graduate First (Maurice Pialat, France)
Hopper's Silence (Brian O'Doherty, USA)
The Last to Know (Bonnie Friedman, USA)
Lightning Over Water (Wim Wenders & Nicholas Ray, West Germany)
Looks and Smiles (Ken Loach, UK)
Mephisto (István Szabó, Hungary)
Mur Murs (Agnès Varda, USA)
The Mystery of Oberwald (Michelangelo Antonioni, Italy)
My Dinner with Andre (Louis Malle, USA)
Passion of Love (Ettore Scola, Italy)
Le Pont du Nord (Jacques Rivette, France)
Resurgence: The Movement for Equality vs. the Ku Klux Klan (Pamela Yates & Tom Sigel, USA)
Soldier Girls (Nick Broomfield & Joan Churchill, USA)
Stations of the Elevated (Manfred Kirchheimer, USA)
Taxi zum Klo (Frank Ripploh, West Germany)
Tighten Your Belts, Bite the Bullet (James Gaffney & Martin Lucas & Jonathan Miller, USA)
Trances (Ahmed El Maanouni, Morocco)
Vernon, Florida (Errol Morris, USA)
We Were German Jews (Michael Blackwood, West Germany)
The Witness (Péter Bacsó, Hungary)
The Woman Next Door (François Truffaut, France)

Films at the 20th New York Film Festival (1982) 

Opening Night: Veronika Voss (Rainer Werner Fassbinder, West Germany)
Closing Night: Fitzcarraldo (Werner Herzog, West Germany)
Another Way (Károly Makk, Hungary)
Before the Nickelodeon: The Early Cinema of Edwin S. Porter (Charles Musser, USA)
City Lovers (Barney Simon, South Africa)
Coming of Age (Josh Hanig, USA)
Dark Circle (Judy Irving & Chris Beaver, USA)
The Draughtsman's Contract (Peter Greenaway, UK)
Eating Raoul (Paul Bartel, USA)
Identification of a Woman (Michelangelo Antonioni, Italy)
Koyaanisqatsi (Godfrey Reggio, USA)
Little People (Jan Krawitz & Thomas Ott, USA)
Little Wars (Maroun Bagdadi, Lebanon)
Moonlighting (Jerzy Skolimowski, UK)
The Night of the Shooting Stars (Paolo and Vittorio Taviani, Italy)
One Man's War (Edgardo Cozarinsky, France)
Say Amen, Somebody (George T. Nierenberg, USA)
The Stationmaster's Wife (Rainer Werner Fassbinder, West Germany)
Tex (Tim Hunter, USA)
Time Stands Still (Péter Gothár, Hungary)
The Trout (Joseph Losey, France)
The Tyrant's Heart (Miklós Jancsó, Hungary)
Vortex (Scott B and Beth B, USA)
Yol (Serif Gören & Yilmaz Güney, Turkey)

Films at the 21st New York Film Festival (1983) 

Opening Night: The Big Chill (Lawrence Kasdan, USA)
Closing Night: Streamers (Robert Altman, USA)
L'Argent (Robert Bresson, France)
Boat People (Ann Hui, Hong Kong)
Burroughs: The Movie (Howard Brookner, USA)
Danton (Andrzej Wajda, France/Poland)
Dhrupad (Mani Kaul, India)
The Eighties (Chantal Akerman, Belgium)
Entre Nous (Diane Kurys, France)
Eréndira (Ruy Guerra, Mexico)
Forbidden Relations (Zsolt Kézdi-Kovács, Hungary)
Heart Like a Wheel (Jonathan Kaplan, USA)
In the White City (Alain Tanner, Portugal/Switzerland)
Last Night at the Alamo (Eagle Pennell, USA)
Life Is a Bed of Roses (Alain Resnais, France)
Lost Illusions (Gyula Gazdag, Hungary)
Nostalghia (Andrei Tarkovsky, Italy)
Passion (Jean-Luc Godard, France/Germany)
Red Love (Rosa von Praunheim, West Germany)
Rumble Fish (Francis Ford Coppola, USA)
Seeing Red (James Klein & Julia Reichert, USA)
So Far From India (Mira Nair, India/USA)
The Story of Piera (Marco Ferreri, Italy)
Vietnam: The Secret Agent (Jacki Ochs, USA)
The Wind (Souleymane Cissé, Mali)

Films at the 22nd New York Film Festival (1984) 

Opening Night: Country (Richard Pearce, USA)
Closing Night: Paris, Texas (Wim Wenders, West Germany)
À nos amours (Maurice Pialat, France)
America and Lewis Hine (Nina Rosenblum, USA)
Blood Simple (Joel Coen, USA)
Cammina Cammina (Ermanno Olmi, Italy)
Class Relations (Jean-Marie Straub & Danièle Huillet, West Germany/France)
Diary for My Children (Márta Mészáros, Hungary)
A Flash of Green (Victor Nuñez, USA)
A Hill on the Dark Side of the Moon (Lennart Hjulström, Sweden)
The Holy Innocents (Mario Camus, Spain)
A Love in Germany (Andrzej Wajda, West Germany)
Love on the Ground (Jacques Rivette, France)
Man of Flowers (Paul Cox, Australia)
Memoirs of Prison (Nelson Pereira dos Santos, Brazil)
Once Upon a Time in America (Sergio Leone, USA)
Shivers (Wojciech Marczewski, Poland)
Stranger Than Paradise (Jim Jarmusch, USA)
Strikebound (Richard Lowenstein, Australia)
A Sunday in the Country (Bertrand Tavernier, France)
Los Sures (Diego Echeverria, USA)
Three Crowns of the Sailor (Raúl Ruiz, France)
The Times of Harvey Milk (Rob Epstein, USA)

Films at the 23rd New York Film Festival (1985) 

Opening Night: Ran (Akira Kurosawa, Japan)
Closing Night: Kaos (Paolo and Vittorio Taviani, Italy)
Angry Harvest (Agnieszka Holland, West Germany)
Bliss (Ray Lawrence, Australia)
Boy Meets Girl (Leos Carax, France)
Chain Letters (Mark Rappaport, USA)
City of Pirates (Raúl Ruiz, Portugal)
Colonel Redl (István Szabó, Hungary)
Destroyed Time (Pierre Beuchot, France)
Himatsuri (Mitsuo Yanagimachi, Japan)
Hail Mary (Jean-Luc Godard, France)
Harvest of Despair (Slavko Nowytski, Canada)
Huey Long (Ken Burns, USA)
Jean Cocteau: Self-Portrait of a Man Unknown (Edgardo Cozarinsky, France)
No Man's Land (Alain Tanner, Switzerland)
Oriana (Fina Torres, Venezuela)
Private Conversations (Christian Blackwood, USA)
The Satin Slipper (Manoel de Oliveira, Portugal)
Steaming (Joseph Losey, UK)
Sugarbaby (Percy Adlon, West Germany)
28 Up (Michael Apted, UK)
When Father Was Away on Business (Emir Kusturica, Yugoslavia)
A Year of the Quiet Sun (Krzysztof Zanussi, Poland)

Films at the 24th New York Film Festival (1986) 

Opening Night: Down by Law (Jim Jarmusch, USA)
Closing Night: Peggy Sue Got Married (Francis Ford Coppola, USA)
The Blind Director (Alexander Kluge, West Germany)
Cactus (Paul Cox, Australia)
Charlotte and Lulu (Claude Miller, France)
Dancing in the Dark (Leon Marr, Canada)
The Decline of the American Empire (Denys Arcand, Canada)
Directed by William Wyler (Aviva Slesin, USA)
Isaac in America: A Journey with Isaac Bashevis Singer (Amram Nowak, USA)
Malandro (Ruy Guerra, Brazil)
Marlene (Maximilian Schell, West Germany)
Ménage (Bertrand Blier, France)
No End (Krzysztof Kieslowski, Poland)
Police (Maurice Pialat, France)
Round Midnight (Bertrand Tavernier, USA)
The Sacrifice (Andrei Tarkovsky, Sweden)
Scene of the Crime (André Téchiné, France)
Sid and Nancy (Alex Cox, UK)
Thérèse (Alain Cavalier, France)
A Time to Live and a Time to Die (Hou Hsiao-hsien, Taiwan)
To Sleep so as to Dream (Kaizo Hayashi, Japan)
True Stories (David Byrne, USA)
A Zed & Two Noughts (Peter Greenaway, UK)

Films at the 25th New York Film Festival (1987) 

Opening Night: Dark Eyes (Nikita Mikhalkov, Italy)
Closing Night: House of Games (David Mamet, USA)
Anita: Dances of Vice (Rosa von Praunheim, West Germany)
Anna (Yurek Bogayevicz, USA)
Babette's Feast (Gabriel Axel, Denmark)
Barfly (Barbet Schroeder, USA)
The Belly of an Architect (Peter Greenaway, UK/Italy)
Boyfriends and Girlfriends (Eric Rohmer, France)
Diary for My Lovers (Márta Mészáros, Hungary)
Fire From the Mountain (Deborah Shaffer, USA)
Hail! Hail! Rock 'n' Roll (Taylor Hackford, USA)
Hope and Glory (John Boorman, UK)
Horowitz Plays Mozart (Albert Maysles & Susan Froemke & Charlotte Zwerin, USA)
Mauvais sang (Leos Carax, France)
Mélo (Alain Resnais, France)
A Month in the Country (Pat O'Connor, UK)
Police Story (Jackie Chan, Hong Kong)
Radium City (Carole Langer, USA)
A Taxing Woman (Juzo Itami, Japan)
The Theme (Gleb Panfilov, USSR)
Under the Sun of Satan (Maurice Pialat, France)
Yeelen (Souleymane Cissé, Mali)

Films at the 26th New York Film Festival (1988) 

Opening Night: Women on the Verge of a Nervous Breakdown (Pedro Almodóvar, Spain)
Closing Night: Red Sorghum (Zhang Yimou, China)
Ashik Kerib (Sergei Parajanov, USSR)
Bird (Clint Eastwood, USA)
Daughter of the Nile (Hou Hsiao-hsien, Taiwan)
Distant Voices, Still Lives (Terence Davies, UK)
Falkenau, the Impossible (Emil Weiss, France)
Felix (Christel Buschmann/Helke Sander/Helma Sanders-Brahms/Margarethe von Trotta, Germany)
Golub (Jerry Blumenthal & Gordon Quinn, USA)
Hard Times (João Botelho, Portugal)
High Hopes (Mike Leigh, UK)
Hôtel Terminus: The Life and Times of Klaus Barbie (Marcel Ophuls, USA)
Jacob (Mircea Daneliuc, Romania)
The Last of England (Derek Jarman, UK)
The Man with Three Coffins (Lee Jang-ho, South Korea)
Mapantsula (Oliver Schmitz, South Africa)
La maschera (Fiorella Infascelli, Italy)
Opening Night (John Cassavetes, USA)
Pelle the Conqueror (Bille August, Denmark)
Salaam Bombay! (Mira Nair, India)
36 Fillette (Catherine Breillat, France)
A Winter Tan (Jackie Burroughs & Louise Clark & John Frizzell & John Walker & Aerlyn Weissman, Canada)

Films at the 27th New York Film Festival (1989) 

Opening Night: Too Beautiful for You (Bertrand Blier, France)
Closing Night: Breaking In (Bill Forsyth, USA)
Ariel (Aki Kaurismäki, Finland)
Black Rain (Shohei Imamura, Japan)
Book of Days (Meredith Monk, USA)
A City of Sadness (Hou Hsiao-hsien, Taiwan)
Confession: A Chronicle of Alienation (Georgiy Gavrilov, USSR)
Current Events (Ralph Arlyck, USA)
Dancing for Mr. B: Six Balanchine Ballerinas (Anne Belle & Deborah Dickson, USA)
The Documentator (István Dárday & Györgyi Szalai, Hungary)
Life and Nothing But (Bertrand Tavernier, France)
The Mahabharata (Peter Brook, France/UK/USA)
Monsieur Hire (Patrice Leconte, France)
My Left Foot (Jim Sheridan, Ireland)
Mystery Train (Jim Jarmusch, USA)
Near Death (Frederick Wiseman, USA)
The Plot Against Harry (Michael Roemer, USA)
Roger & Me (Michael Moore, USA)
A Short Film About Killing (Krzysztof Kieslowski, Poland)
Speaking Parts (Atom Egoyan, Canada)
Strapless (David Hare, UK)
Sweetie (Jane Campion, New Zealand)
A Tale of the Wind (Joris Ivens & Marceline Loridan, France)
Thelonious Monk: Straight, No Chaser (Charlotte Zwerin, USA)
Yaaba (Idrissa Ouedraogo, Burkina Faso)

Films at the 28th New York Film Festival (1990) 

Opening Night: Miller's Crossing (Joel Coen, USA)
Closing Night: The Nasty Girl (Michael Verhoeven, West Germany)
American Dream (Barbara Kopple, USA)
An Angel at My Table (Jane Campion, New Zealand)
Doctor Petiot (Christian de Chalonge, France)
Freeze Die Come to Life (Vitali Kanevsky, USSR)
The Golden Boat (Raúl Ruiz, USA)
Golden Braid (Paul Cox, Australia)
I Hired a Contract Killer (Aki Kaurismäki, Finland)
Ju Dou (Zhang Yimou, China)
King of New York (Abel Ferrara, USA)
Listen Up: The Lives of Quincy Jones (Ellen Weissbrod & Courtney Sale Ross, USA)
The Match Factory Girl (Aki Kaurismäki, Finland)
Night Sun (Paolo and Vittorio Taviani, Italy)
No, or the Vain Glory of Command (Manoel de Oliveira, Portugal)
Nouvelle Vague (Jean-Luc Godard, Switzerland/France)
Open Doors (Gianni Amelio, Italy)
Privilege (Yvonne Rainer, USA)
Siddheshwari (Mani Kaul, India)
The Sting of Death (Kohei Oguri, Japan)
A Tale of Springtime (Eric Rohmer, France)
Taxi Blues (Pavel Lungin, USSR)
Tilaï (Idrissa Ouédraogo, Burkina Faso)
To Sleep with Anger (Charles Burnett, USA)
A Woman's Revenge (Jacques Doillon, France)

Films at the 29th New York Film Festival (1991) 

Opening Night: The Double Life of Veronique (Krzysztof Kieslowski, France)
Closing Night: Homicide (David Mamet, USA)
Adam's Rib (Vyacheslav Krishtofovich, Russia)
The Adjuster (Atom Egoyan, Canada)
Amelia Lópes O'Neill (Valeria Sarmiento, Chile)
Beauty and the Beast [work-in-progress] (Gary Trousdale & Kirk Wise, USA)
La Belle Noiseuse (Jacques Rivette, France)
Delicatessen (Jean-Pierre Jeunet & Marc Caro, France)
Intimate Stranger (Alan Berliner, USA)
Inventory (Krzysztof Zanussi, Poland)
Jacquot de Nantes (Agnès Varda, France)
Life on a String (Chen Kaige, China)
Locked-Up Time (Sibylle Schönemann, Germany)
My Own Private Idaho (Gus Van Sant, USA)
Night on Earth (Jim Jarmusch, USA)
No Life King (Jun Ichikawa, Japan)
The Other Eye (Johanna Heer & Werner Schmiedel, Austria)
Pictures From a Revolution (Susan Meiselas & Richard P. Rogers & Alfred Guzzetti, USA)
Prospero's Books (Peter Greenaway, UK)
The Rapture (Michael Tolkin, USA)
The Suspended Step of the Stork (Theo Angelopoulos, Greece)
Toto le héros (Jaco Van Dormael, Belgium)
Woman of the Port (Arturo Ripstein, Mexico)
Zombie and the Ghost Train (Mika Kaurismäki, Finland)

Films at the 30th New York Film Festival (1992) 

Opening Night: Olivier, Olivier (Agnieszka Holland, France)
Closing Night: Night and the City (Irwin Winkler, USA)
Allah Tantou (David Achkar, Guinea/France)
And Life Goes On (Abbas Kiarostami, Iran)
Autumn Moon (Clara Law, Hong Kong)
Benny's Video (Michael Haneke, Austria)
Careful (Guy Maddin, Canada)
The Crying Game (Neil Jordan, Ireland/UK)
Delivered Vacant (Nora Jacobsen, USA)
Dream of Light (Víctor Erice, Spain)
Hyenas (Djibril Diop Mambéty, Senegal)
Idiot (Mani Kaul, India)
In the Soup (Alexandre Rockwell, USA)
Léolo (Jean-Claude Lauzon, Canada)
The Lovers on the Bridge (Leos Carax, France)
Lumumba, Death of a Prophet (Raoul Peck, Germany/Switzerland)
Man Bites Dog (Rémy Belvaux & André Bonzel & Benoît Poelvoorde, Belgium)
The Oak (Lucian Pintilie, Romania)
La Sentinelle (Arnaud Desplechin, France)
Stone (Alexander Sokurov, Russia)
The Story of Qiu Ju (Zhang Yimou, China)
Strictly Ballroom (Baz Luhrmann, Australia)
A Tale of Winter (Eric Rohmer, France)
La Vie de bohème (Aki Kaurismäki, Finland)
Zebrahead (Anthony Drazan, USA)

Films at the 31st New York Film Festival (1993) 

Opening Night: Short Cuts (Robert Altman, USA)
Closing Night: The Piano (Jane Campion, France/Australia)
Aileen Wuornos: The Selling of a Serial Killer (Nick Broomfield, USA)
Birthplace (Pawel Lozinski, Poland)
Blue (Derek Jarman, UK)
The Blue Kite (Tian Zhuangzhuang, China)
Calendar (Atom Egoyan, Canada/Armenia)
Farewell My Concubine (Chen Kaige, China)
Fiorile (Paolo and Vittorio Taviani, Italy)
It's All True: Based on an Unfinished Film by Orson Welles (Bill Krohn & Myron Miesel & Richard Wilson, Brazil/France/USA)
Naked (Mike Leigh, UK)
The Night (Mohammad Malas, Syria/Lebanon)
The Nightmare Before Christmas (Henry Selick, USA)
The Puppetmaster (Hou Hsiao-hsien, Taiwan)
Raining Stones (Ken Loach, UK)
Ruby in Paradise (Victor Nuñez, USA)
The Scent of Green Papaya (Tran Anh Hung, Vietnam/France)
Shades of Doubt (Aline Issermann, France)
The Snapper (Stephen Frears, UK)
Three Colours: Blue (Krzysztof Kieslowski, France)
Totally F***ed Up (Gregg Araki, USA)
Valley of Abraham (Manoel de Oliveira, Portugal)
The War Room (D.A. Pennebaker & Chris Hegedus, USA)
Wendemi (S. Pierre Yameogo, Burkina Faso)
The Wonderful, Horrible Life of Leni Riefenstahl (Ray Müller, Germany/Belgium/UK)

Films at the 32nd New York Film Festival (1994) 

Opening Night: Pulp Fiction (Quentin Tarantino, USA)
Centerpiece: Bullets over Broadway (Woody Allen, USA)
Closing Night: Hoop Dreams (Steve James, USA)
Amateur (Hal Hartley, USA)
Caro diario (Nanni Moretti, Italy)
Chungking Express (Wong Kar-wai, Hong Kong)
Cold Water (Olivier Assayas, France)
A Confucian Confusion (Edward Yang, Taiwan)
Crumb (Terry Zwigoff, USA)
Ed Wood (Tim Burton, USA)
Exotica (Atom Egoyan, Canada)
Ladybird, Ladybird (Ken Loach, UK)
Postcards From America (Steve McLean, USA)
The Red Lotus Society (Stan Lai, Taiwan)
Sátántangó (Béla Tarr, Hungary)
See How They Fall (Jacques Audiard, France)
The Silences of the Palace (Moufida Tlatli, Tunisia)
Strawberry and Chocolate (Tomás Gutiérrez Alea & Juan Carlos Tabío, Cuba)
Theremin: An Electronic Odyssey (Steven M. Martin, USA)
Through the Olive Trees (Abbas Kiarostami, Iran)
Three Colours: Red (Krzysztof Kieslowski, France)
To Live (Zhang Yimou, China)
To the Starry Island (Park Kwang-su, South Korea)
The Troubles We've Seen (Marcel Ophuls, France)
Wild Reeds (André Téchiné, France)

Films at the 33rd New York Film Festival (1995) 

Opening Night: Shanghai Triad (Zhang Yimou, China)
Centerpiece: Strange Days (Kathryn Bigelow, USA)
Closing Night: Carrington (Christopher Hampton, UK)
Augustin (Anne Fontaine, France)
Beyond the Clouds (Michelangelo Antonioni, France/Italy/Germany)
The Celluloid Closet (Rob Epstein and Jeffrey Friedman, USA)
Cinema of Unease: A Personal Journey by Sam Neill (Sam Neill & Judy Rymer, New Zealand/UK)
Citizen Langlois (Edgardo Cozarinsky, France)
The Convent (Manoel de Oliveira, Portugal)
Cyclo (Tran Anh Hung, France/Vietnam)
Dead Presidents (Hughes brothers, USA)
Flamenco (Carlos Saura, Spain)
Flirt (Hal Hartley, USA)
The Flower of My Secret (Pedro Almodóvar, Spain)
Le Franc (Djibril Diop Mambéty, Senegal/Switzerland)
From the Journals of Jean Seberg (Mark Rappaport, USA)
The Gate of Heavenly Peace (Richard Gordon & Carma Hinton, USA)
Georgia (Ulu Grosbard, USA)
Good Men, Good Women (Hou Hsiao-hsien, Taiwan)
Guimba the Tyrant (Cheick Oumar Sissoko, Mali/Burkina Faso)
La Haine (Matthieu Kassovitz, France)
Kicking and Screaming (Noah Baumbach, USA)
Lamerica (Gianni Amelio, Italy/France)
Land and Freedom (Ken Loach, UK)
The Neon Bible (Terence Davies, UK)
Sixteen-Oh-Sixty (Vinicius Mainardi, Brazil)
The Son of Gascogne (Pascal Aubier, France)
The White Balloon (Jafar Panahi, Iran)

Films at the 34th New York Film Festival (1996) 

Opening Night: Secrets & Lies (Mike Leigh, UK)
Centerpiece: Thieves (André Téchiné, France)
Closing Night: The People vs. Larry Flynt (Miloš Forman, USA)
Beyond the Clouds (Michelangelo Antonioni, France/Italy/Germany)
Breaking the Waves (Lars von Trier, Denmark)
Emigration, N.Y. (Egon Humer, Austria)
Fire (Deepa Mehta, Canada/India)
Frantz Fanon: Black Skin, White Mask (Isaac Julien, UK)
Gabbeh (Mohsen Makhmalbaf, Iran)
Le Garçu (Maurice Pialat, France)
Goodbye South, Goodbye (Hou Hsiao-hsien, Taiwan)
illtown (Nick Gomez, USA)
Irma Vep (Olivier Assayas, France)
Lilies (John Greyson, Canada)
Mahjong (Edward Yang, Taiwan)
Mandela (Angus Gibson & Jo Menell, USA)
My Sex Life... or How I Got into an Argument (Arnaud Desplechin, France)
Nobody's Business (Alan Berliner, USA)
La Promesse (Jean-Pierre & Luc Dardenne, Belgium)
Salut cousin! (Merzak Allouache, France/Algeria)
A Self Made Hero (Jacques Audiard, France)
Sling Blade (Billy Bob Thornton, USA)
subUrbia (Richard Linklater, USA)
Suzanne Farrell: Elusive Muse (Anne Belle & Deborah Dickson, USA)
Temptress Moon (Chen Kaige, China)
Three Lives and Only One Death (Raúl Ruiz, France)
Umm Kulthum: A Voice Like Egypt (Michal Goldman, USA)
Underground (Emir Kusturica, France/Germany)

Films at the 35th New York Film Festival (1997) 

Opening Night: The Ice Storm (Ang Lee, US)
Centerpiece: The Sweet Hereafter (Atom Egoyan, Canada)
Closing Night: Live Flesh (Pedro Almodóvar, Spain)
The Apostle (Robert Duvall, USA)
Boogie Nights (Paul Thomas Anderson, USA)
Deep Crimson (Arturo Ripstein, Mexico)
Destiny (Youssef Chahine, Egypt)
Fallen Angels (Wong Kar-wai, Hong Kong)
Fast, Cheap & out of Control (Errol Morris, USA)
Fireworks (Takeshi Kitano, Japan)
From Today Until Tomorrow (Jean-Marie Straub & Danièle Huillet, France)
Happy Together (Wong Kar-wai, Hong Kong)
Kiss or Kill (Bill Bennett, Australia)
Kitchen (Yim Ho, Hong Kong)
Love and Death on Long Island (Richard Kwietniowski, UK)
Ma vie en rose (Alain Berliner, Belgium)
Marcello Mastroianni: I Remember (Anna Maria Tatò, Italy)
Martín (Hache) (Adolfo Aristarain, Argentina)
Mother and Son (Alexander Sokurov, Russia)
Post Coitum (Brigitte Roüan, France)
Public Housing (Frederick Wiseman, USA)
Taste of Cherry (Abbas Kiarostami, Iran)
Telling Lies in America (Guy Ferland, USA)
La Vie de Jésus (Bruno Dumont, France)
Voyage to the Beginning of the World (Manoel de Oliveira, Portugal)
Washington Square (Agnieszka Holland, USA)

Films at the 36th New York Film Festival (1998) 

Opening Night: Celebrity (Woody Allen, USA)
Centerpiece: Black Cat, White Cat (Emir Kusturica, Yugoslavia/Germany/France)
Closing Night: The Dreamlife of Angels (Erick Zonca, France)
The Apple (Samira Makhmalbaf, Iran/France)
Autumn Tale (Eric Rohmer, France)
The Book of Life (Hal Hartley, USA)
The Celebration (Thomas Vinterberg, Denmark)
Dr. Akagi (Shohei Imamura, Japan)
Flowers of Shanghai (Hou Hsiao-hsien, Taiwan)
The General (John Boorman, Ireland)
Gods and Monsters (Bill Condon, USA)
Happiness (Todd Solondz, USA)
I Stand Alone (Gaspar Noé, France)
The Inheritors (Stefan Ruzowitzky, Austria)
Khrustalyov, My Car! (Aleksei German, Russia/France)
Late August, Early September (Olivier Assayas, France)
Life on Earth (Abderrahmane Sissako, France/Mauritania/Mali)
My Name Is Joe (Ken Loach, UK)
River of Gold (Paulo Rocha, Portugal)
Rushmore (Wes Anderson, USA)
Same Old Song (Alain Resnais, France)
Slam (Marc Levin, USA)
Velvet Goldmine (Todd Haynes, USA)
You're Laughing (Paolo and Vittorio Taviani, Italy)

Films at the 37th New York Film Festival (1999) 

Opening Night: All About My Mother (Pedro Almodóvar, Spain)
Centerpiece: Topsy-Turvy (Mike Leigh, UK)
Closing Night: Felicia's Journey (Atom Egoyan, UK/Canada)
Beau travail (Claire Denis, France)
Being John Malkovich (Spike Jonze, USA)
Boys Don't Cry (Kimberly Peirce, USA)
The Carriers Are Waiting (Benoît Mariage, France/Belgium/Switzerland)
The Color of Paradise (Majid Majidi, Iran)
Dogma (Kevin Smith, USA)
Holy Smoke! (Jane Campion, Australia)
Juha (Aki Kaurismäki, Finland)
julien donkey-boy (Harmony Korine, USA)
The Letter (Manoel de Oliveira, France/Portugal)
License to Live (Kiyoshi Kurosawa, Japan)
Mobutu, King of Zaire (Thierry Michel, Belgium)
The Other (Youssef Chahine, France/Egypt)
Pola X (Leos Carax, France)
Princess Mononoke (Hayao Miyazaki, Japan)
Pripyat (Nikolaus Geyrhalter, Austria)
Rien sur Robert (Pascal Bonitzer, France)
Rosetta (Jean-Pierre & Luc Dardenne, France/Belgium)
Set Me Free (Léa Pool, Canada)
Sicilia! (Danièle Huillet & Jean-Marie Straub, Italy)
Time Regained (Raúl Ruiz, France)
The Woman Chaser (Robinson Devor, USA)

Films at the 38th New York Film Festival (2000) 

Opening Night: Dancer in the Dark (Lars von Trier, Denmark/Sweden/France)
Centerpiece: Pollock (Ed Harris, USA)
Closing Night: Crouching Tiger, Hidden Dragon (Ang Lee, Taiwan)
Amores perros (Alejandro González Iñárritu, Mexico)
Before Night Falls (Julian Schnabel, USA)
Boesman and Lena (John Berry, France/South Africa)
Brother (Takeshi Kitano, Japan/France/USA/UK)
Chronically Unfeasible (Sergio Bianchi, Brazil)
Chunhyang (Im Kwon-taek, South Korea)
The Circle (Jafar Panahi, Iran)
The Comedy of Innocence (Raúl Ruiz, France)
Eureka (Shinji Aoyama, Japan)
Faithless (Liv Ullmann, Sweden)
George Washington (David Gordon Green, USA)
The Gleaners and I (Agnès Varda, France)
The House of Mirth (Terence Davies, UK/USA)
In the Mood for Love (Wong Kar-wai, Hong Kong)
Kippur (Amos Gitai, Israel/France)
Krapp's Last Tape (Atom Egoyan, Canada/UK)
Platform (Jia Zhangke, China/Japan)
Smell of Camphor, Fragrance of Jasmine (Bahman Farmanara, Iran)
Taboo (Nagisa Oshima, Japan)
The Taste of Others (Agnès Jaoui, France)
Yi Yi (Edward Yang, Taiwan/Japan)

Films at the 39th New York Film Festival (2001) 

Opening Night: Va savoir (Jacques Rivette, France)
Centerpiece: Mulholland Drive (David Lynch, USA)
Closing Night: In Praise of Love (Jean-Luc Godard, Switzerland/France)
All About Lily Chou-Chou (Shunji Iwai, Japan)
Baran (Majid Majidi, Iran)
Deep Breath (Damien Odoul, France)
Fat Girl (Catherine Breillat, France/Italy)
I'm Going Home (Manoel de Oliveira, Portugal/France)
Intimacy (Patrice Chéreau, France)
Italian for Beginners (Lone Scherfig, Denmark)
La ciénaga (Lucrecia Martel, Argentina/Spain)
La Libertad (Lisandro Alonso, Argentina)
The Lady and the Duke (Eric Rohmer, France)
The Royal Tenenbaums (Wes Anderson, USA)
Silence...We're Rolling (Youssef Chahine, Egypt/France)
Sobibor, October 14, 1943, 4 p.m. (Claude Lanzmann, France)
The Son's Room (Nanni Moretti, Italy)
Storytelling (Todd Solondz, USA)
That Old Dream That Moves (Alain Guiraudie, France)
Time Out (Laurent Cantet, France)
Waking Life (Richard Linklater, USA)
Warm Water Under a Red Bridge (Shohei Imamura, Japan)
What Time Is It There? (Tsai Ming-liang, Taiwan/France)
Y tu mamá también (Alfonso Cuarón, Mexico)

Films at the 40th New York Film Festival (2002) 

Opening Night: About Schmidt (Alexander Payne, USA)
Centerpiece: Punch-Drunk Love (Paul Thomas Anderson, USA)
Closing Night: Talk to Her (Pedro Almodóvar, Spain)
Auto Focus (Paul Schrader, USA)
Blind Spot: Hitler's Secretary (André Heller & Othmar Schimderer, Austria)
Bloody Sunday (Paul Greengrass, UK)
Chi-hwa-seon (Im Kwon-taek, South Korea)
Divine Intervention (Elia Suleiman, France/Palestine)
Friday Night (Claire Denis, France)
Love & Diane (Jennifer Dworkin, USA/France)
The Magdalene Sisters (Peter Mullan, UK)
The Man Without a Past (Aki Kaurismäki, Finland)
Monday Morning (Otar Iosseliani, France/Italy)
My Mother's Smile (Marco Bellocchio, Italy)
Russian Ark (Alexander Sokurov, Russia/Germany)
Safe Conduct (Bertrand Tavernier, France)
The Son (Jean-Pierre & Luc Dardenne, Belgium/France)
Springtime in a Small Town (Tian Zhuangzhuang, China)
Ten (Abbas Kiarostami, Iran/France)
To Be and to Have (Nicolas Philibert, France)
Turning Gate (Hong Sang-soo, South Korea)
The Uncertainty Principle (Manoel de Oliveira, Portugal/France)
Unknown Pleasures (Jia Zhangke, China/Japan)
Waiting for Happiness (Abderrahmane Sissako, Mauritania/France)

Films at the 41st New York Film Festival (2003) 

Opening Night: Mystic River (Clint Eastwood, USA)
Centerpiece: The Fog of War (Errol Morris, USA)
Closing Night: 21 Grams (Alejandro González Iñárritu, USA)
The Barbarian Invasions (Denys Arcand, Canada)
Bright Leaves (Ross McElwee, USA)
Crimson Gold (Jafar Panahi, Iran)
Distant (Nuri Bilge Ceylan, Turkey)
Dogville (Lars von Trier, Denmark/Sweden/France)
Elephant (Gus Van Sant, USA)
The Flower of Evil (Claude Chabrol, France)
Free Radicals (Barbara Albert, Austria)
Good Morning, Night (Marco Bellocchio, Italy)
Goodbye, Dragon Inn (Tsai Ming-liang, Taiwan)
Mansion by the Lake (Lester James Peries, Sri Lanka)
Mayor of the Sunset Strip (George Hickenlooper, USA)
Pornography (Jan Jakub Kolski, Poland)
PTU (Johnnie To, Hong Kong)
Raja (Jacques Doillon, France)
S-21: The Khmer Rouge Killing Machine (Rithy Panh, France)
Since Otar Left (Julie Bertuccelli, France)
A Thousand Months (Faouzi Bensaïdi, France/Morocco)
Young Adam (David Mackenzie, UK)

Films at the 42nd New York Film Festival (2004) 

Opening Night: Look at Me (Agnès Jaoui, France)
Centerpiece: Bad Education (Pedro Almodóvar, Spain)
Closing Night: Sideways (Alexander Payne, USA)
Café Lumière (Hou Hsiao-hsien, Japan/Taiwan)
The Gate of the Sun (Yousry Nasrallah, France/Egypt)
The Holy Girl (Lucrecia Martel, Argentina)
House of Flying Daggers (Zhang Yimou, China)
In the Battlefields (Danielle Arbid, Lebanon/France)
Keane (Lodge Kerrigan, USA)
Kings and Queen (Arnaud Desplechin, France)
Moolaadé (Ousmane Sembène, Senegal)
Notre musique (Jean-Luc Godard, Switzerland/France)
Or (My Treasure) (Keren Yedaya, Israel)
Palindromes (Todd Solondz, USA)
Rolling Family (Pablo Trapero, Argentina)
Saraband (Ingmar Bergman, Sweden)
Tarnation (Jonathan Caouette, USA)
The 10th District Court: Moments of Trial (Raymond Depardon, France)
Triple Agent (Eric Rohmer, France)
Tropical Malady (Apichatpong Weerasethakul, Thailand)
Undertow (David Gordon Green, USA)
Vera Drake (Mike Leigh, UK)
Woman Is the Future of Man (Hong Sang-soo, South Korea/France)
The World (Jia Zhangke, China)

Films at the 43rd New York Film Festival (2005) 

Opening Night: Good Night, and Good Luck. (George Clooney, USA)
Centerpiece: Breakfast on Pluto (Neil Jordan, USA)
Closing Night: Caché (Michael Haneke, France)
Avenge But One of My Two Eyes (Avi Mograbi, Israel/France)
Bubble (Steven Soderbergh, USA)
Capote (Bennett Miller, USA)
The Death of Mr. Lazarescu (Cristi Puiu, Romania)
L'Enfant (Jean-Pierre & Luc Dardenne, Belgium/France)
Gabrielle (Patrice Chéreau, France)
I Am (Dorota Kedzierzawska, Poland)
Manderlay (Lars von Trier, Denmark/Sweden/France)
Methadonia (Michel Negroponte, USA)
Paradise Now (Hany Abu-Assad, Netherlands/Germany/France)
The President's Last Bang (Im Sang-soo, South Korea)
Regular Lovers (Philippe Garrel, France)
Something Like Happiness (Bohdan Sláma, Czech Republic)
The Squid and the Whale (Noah Baumbach, USA)
The Sun (Alexander Sokurov, Russia/Italy/France/Switzerland)
Sympathy for Lady Vengeance (Park Chan-wook, South Korea)
Tale of Cinema (Hong Sang-soo, South Korea)
Three Times (Hou Hsiao-hsien, Taiwan)
Through the Forest (Jean-Paul Civeyrac, France)
Tristram Shandy: A Cock and Bull Story (Michael Winterbottom, UK)
Who's Camus Anyway? (Mitsuo Yanagimachi, Japan)

Films at the 44th New York Film Festival (2006) 

Opening Night: The Queen (Stephen Frears, UK)
Centerpiece: Volver (Pedro Almodóvar, Spain)
Closing Night: Pan's Labyrinth (Guillermo del Toro, Spain/Mexico)
49 Up (Michael Apted, UK)
August Days (Marc Recha, Spain)
Bamako (Abderrahmane Sissako, Africa)
Belle Toujours (Manoel de Oliveira, Portugal)
Climates (Nuri Bilge Ceylan, Turkey)
Election 2 (Johnnie To, Hong Kong)
Falling (Barbara Albert, Germany/Austria)
Gardens in Autumn (Otar Iosseliani, France/Italy/Russia)
The Go Master (Tian Zhuangzhuang, Japan/China)
The Host (Bong Joon-ho, South Korea)
Inland Empire (David Lynch, US)
The Journals of Knud Rasmussen (Zacharias Kunuk & Norman Cohn, Canada/Denmark/Greenland)
Little Children (Todd Field, US)
Marie Antoinette (Sofia Coppola, US)
Offside (Jafar Panahi, Iran)
Our Daily Bread (Nikolaus Geyrhalter, Germany/Austria)
Paprika (Satoshi Kon, Japan)
Poison Friends  (Emmanuel Bourdieu, France)
Private Fears in Public Places (Alain Resnais, France)
Syndromes and a Century (Apichatpong Weerasethakul, Thailand)
These Girls (Tahani Rached, Egypt)
Woman on the Beach (Hong Sang-soo, South Korea)

Films at the 45th New York Film Festival (2007) 

Opening Night: The Darjeeling Limited (Wes Anderson, USA)
Centerpiece: No Country for Old Men (Joel Coen & Ethan Coen, USA)
Closing Night: Persepolis (Marjane Satrapi & Vincent Paronnaud, France)
Actresses (Valeria Bruni Tedeschi, France)
Alexandra (Alexander Sokurov, Russia)
The Axe in the Attic (Ed Pincus & Lucia Small, USA)
Before the Devil Knows You're Dead (Sidney Lumet, USA)
Calle Santa Fe (Carmen Castillo, France)
The Diving Bell and the Butterfly (Julian Schnabel, USA)
Flight of the Red Balloon (Hou Hsiao-hsien, France)
4 Months, 3 Weeks and 2 Days (Cristian Mungiu, Romania)
A Girl Cut in Two (Claude Chabrol, France)
Go Go Tales (Abel Ferrara, Italy/USA)
I Just Didn't Do It (Masayuki Suo, Japan)
I'm Not There (Todd Haynes, USA)
In the City of Sylvia (José Luis Guerin, Spain/France)
The Last Mistress (Catherine Breillat, France)
The Man From London (Béla Tarr, Hungary/France/Germany)
Margot at the Wedding (Noah Baumbach, USA)
Married Life (Ira Sachs, USA)
Mr. Warmth: The Don Rickles Project (John Landis, USA)
The Orphanage (J.A. Bayona, Spain)
Paranoid Park (Gus Van Sant, USA)
Redacted (Brian De Palma, USA)
The Romance of Astrea and Celadon (Eric Rohmer, France)
Secret Sunshine (Lee Chang-dong, South Korea)
Silent Light (Carlos Reygadas, Mexico)
Useless (Jia Zhangke, Hong Kong)

Films at the 46th New York Film Festival (2008) 

Opening Night: The Class (Laurent Cantet, France)
Centerpiece: Changeling (Clint Eastwood, USA)
Closing Night: The Wrestler (Darren Aronofsky, USA)
24 City (Jia Zhangke, China/Hong Kong/Japan)
Afterschool (Antonio Campos, USA)
Ashes of Time Redux (Wong Kar-wai, Hong Kong)
Bullet in the Head (Jaime Rosales, Spain/France)
Che (Steven Soderbergh, France/Spain)
Chouga (Darezhan Omirbaev, France/Kazakhstan)
A Christmas Tale (Arnaud Desplechin, France)
Four Nights with Anna (Jerzy Skolimowski, Poland/France)
Gomorrah (Matteo Garrone, Italy)
Happy-Go-Lucky (Mike Leigh, UK)
The Headless Woman (Lucrecia Martel, Argentina/France/Italy/Spain)
Hunger (Steve McQueen, UK)
I'm Gonna Explode (Gerardo Naranjo, Mexico)
Let It Rain (Agnès Jaoui, France)
Night and Day (Hong Sang-soo, South Korea)
The Northern Land (João Botelho, Portugal)
Serbis (Brillante Mendoza, Philippines/France/)
Summer Hours (Olivier Assayas, France)
Tokyo Sonata (Kiyoshi Kurosawa, Japan/Netherlands)
Tony Manero (Pablo Larraín, Chile/Brazil)
Tulpan (Sergey Dvortsevoy, Germany/Kazakhstan/Poland/Russia/Switzerland)
Waltz with Bashir (Ari Folman, Israel/Germany/France/)
Wendy and Lucy (Kelly Reichardt, USA)
The Windmill Movie (Alexander Olch, USA)

Films at the 47th New York Film Festival (2009) 

Opening Night: Wild Grass (Alain Resnais, France)
Centerpiece: Precious: Based on the Novel "Push" by Sapphire (Lee Daniels, USA)
Closing Night: Broken Embraces (Pedro Almodóvar, Spain)
Around a Small Mountain (Jacques Rivette, France)
Antichrist (Lars von Trier, Denmark)
The Art of the Steal (Don Argott, USA)
Bluebeard (Catherine Breillat, France)
Eccentricities of a Blonde-Haired Girl (Manoel de Oliveira, Portugal/France)
Everyone Else (Maren Ade, Germany)
Ghost Town (Zhao Dayong, China)
Hadewijch (Bruno Dumont, France)
Independencia (Raya Martin, Philippines)
Henri-Georges Clouzot's Inferno (Serge Bromberg, France)
Kanikôsen (Sabu, Japan)
Lebanon (Samuel Maoz, Israel)
Life During Wartime (Todd Solondz, USA)
Min Ye (Souleymane Cissé, Mali/France)
Mother (Bong Joon-ho, South Korea)
Ne change rien (Pedro Costa, France/Portugal)
Police, Adjective (Corneliu Porumboiu, Romania)
Room and a Half (Andrei Khrzhanovsky, Russia)
Sweetgrass (Alisa Barbash & Lucien Castaing-Taylor, USA)
Sweet Rush (Andrzej Wajda, Poland/France)
To Die Like a Man (João Pedro Rodrigues, Portugal)
Trash Humpers (Harmony Korine, USA/UK)
Vincere (Marco Bellocchio, Italy)
White Material (Claire Denis, France)
The White Ribbon (Michael Haneke, Austria/France)

Films at the 48th New York Film Festival (2010) 

Opening Night: The Social Network (David Fincher, USA)
Centerpiece: The Tempest (Julie Taymor, USA)
Closing Night: Hereafter (Clint Eastwood, USA)
Another Year (Mike Leigh, UK)
Aurora (Cristi Puiu, Romania)
Black Venus (Abdellatif Kechiche, France)
Carlos (Olivier Assayas, France)
Certified Copy (Abbas Kiarostami, Iran/France/Italy)
Film Socialisme (Jean-Luc Godard, France)
Inside Job (Charles Ferguson, USA)
Le quattro volte (Michelangelo Frammartino, Italy)
LENNONYC (Michael Epstein, USA)
Meek's Cutoff (Kelly Reichardt, USA)
My Joy (Sergei Loznitsa, Ukraine)
Mysteries of Lisbon (Raul Ruiz, Portugal)
Of Gods and Men (Xavier Beauvois, France)
Oki's Movie (Hong Sang-Soo, South Korea)
Old Cats (Sebastián Silva, Chile)
Poetry (Lee Chang-dong, South Korea)
Post Mortem (Pablo Larraín, Chile)
Revolución (various directors, Mexico)
The Robber (Benjamin Heisenberg, Germany)
Robinson in Ruins (Patrick Keiller, UK)
Silent Souls (Aleksey Fedorchenko, Russia)
The Strange Case of Angelica (Manoel de Oliveira, Portugal)
Tuesday, After Christmas (Radu Muntean, Romania)
Uncle Boonmee Who Can Recall His Past Lives (Apichatpong Weerasethakul, Thailand)
We Are What We Are (Jorge Michel Grau, Mexico)

Films at the 49th New York Film Festival (2011) 

Opening Night: Carnage (Roman Polanski, France/Poland)
Centerpiece: My Week with Marilyn (Simon Curtis, UK)
Closing Night: The Descendants (Alexander Payne, USA)
The Artist (Michel Hazanavicius, France)
Corpo Celeste (Alice Rohrwacher, Italy/Switzerland/France)
A Dangerous Method (David Cronenberg, Canada/UK/Germany)
Footnote (Joseph Cedar, Israel)
4:44 Last Day on Earth (Abel Ferrara, USA)
George Harrison: Living in the Material World (Martin Scorsese, USA)
Goodbye First Love (Mia Hansen-Løve, France)
Le Havre (Aki Kaurismäki, Finland/France)
The Kid with a Bike (Jean-Luc and Pierre Dardenne, Belgium/France)
The Loneliest Planet (Julia Loktev, USA)
Martha Marcy May Marlene (Sean Durkin, USA)
Melancholia (Lars von Trier, Denmark)
Miss Bala (Gerardo Naranjo, Mexico)
Once Upon a Time in Anatolia (Nuri Bilge Ceylan, Turkey)
Pina (Wim Wenders, Germany)
Play (Ruben Östlund, Sweden)
Policeman (Nadav Lapid, Israel)
A Separation (Asghar Farhadi, Iran)
Shame (Steve McQueen, UK)
The Skin I Live In (Pedro Almodóvar, Spain)
Sleeping Sickness (Ulrich Köhler, Germany)
The Student (Santiago Mitre, Argentina)
The Turin Horse (Béla Tarr, Hungary)
This Is Not a Film (Jafar Panahi & Mojtaba Mirtahmasb, Iran)

Films at the 50th New York Film Festival (2012) 

Opening Night: Life of Pi (Ang Lee, USA)
Centerpiece: Not Fade Away (David Chase, USA)
Closing Night: Flight (Robert Zemeckis, USA)
Amour (Michael Haneke, Austria/France/Germany)
Aquí y allá (Antonio Méndez Esparza, Spain/USA/Mexico)
Araf — Somewhere In Between (Yeşim Ustaoğlu, Turkey/France/Germany)
Barbara (Christian Petzold, Germany)
Beyond the Hills (Cristian Mungiu, Romania)
Bwakaw (Jun Robles Lana, Philippines)
Caesar Must Die (Paolo and Vittorio Taviani, Italy)
Camille Rewinds (Noémie Lvovsky, France)
The Dead Man and Being Happy (Javier Rebello, Spain/Argentina)
Fill the Void (Rama Burshtein, Israel)
First Cousin Once Removed (Alan Berliner, USA)
Frances Ha (Noah Baumbach, USA)
The Gatekeepers (Dror Moreh, Israel/France/Germany/Belgium)
Ginger & Rosa (Sally Potter, UK)
Holy Motors (Leos Carax, France)
Hyde Park on Hudson (Roger Michell, UK)
Kinshasa Kids (Marc-Henri Wajnberg, Belgium/France)
The Last Time I Saw Macao (João Pedro Rodrigues, Portugal/France)
Leviathan (Lucien Castaing-Taylor & Véréna Paravel, France/UK/USA)
Like Someone in Love (Abbas Kiarostami, Japan/Iran/France)
Lines of Wellington (Valeria Sarmiento, France/Portugal)
Memories Look at Me (Song Fang, China)
Night Across the Street (Raúl Ruiz, France/Chile)
NO (Pablo Larraín, Chile/USA/Mexico)
Our Children (Joachim Lafosse, Belgium/Luxembourg/France/Switzerland)
The Paperboy (Lee Daniels, USA)
Passion (Brian De Palma, France/Germany)
Something in the Air (Olivier Assayas, France)
Tabu (Miguel Gomes, Portugal)
You Ain't Seen Nothin' Yet (Alain Resnais, France)

Films at the 51st New York Film Festival (2013) 

Opening Night: Captain Phillips (Paul Greengrass, USA)
Centerpiece: The Secret Life of Walter Mitty (Ben Stiller, USA)
Closing Night: Her (Spike Jonze, USA)
About Time (Richard Curtis, UK)
Abuse of Weakness (Catherine Breillat, France)
Alan Partridge (Declan Lowney, UK/France)
All Is Lost (J.C. Chandor, USA)
American Promise (Joe Brewster & Michèle Stephenson, USA)
At Berkeley (Frederick Wiseman, USA)
Bastards (Claire Denis, France/Germany)
Blue Is the Warmest Color (Abdellatif Kechiche, France)
Burning Bush (Agnieszka Holland, Czech Republic)
Child of God (James Franco, USA)
Gloria (Sebastián Lelio, Chile/Spain)
The Immigrant (James Gray, USA)
Inside Llewyn Davis (Joel Coen & Ethan Coen, USA)
The Invisible Woman (Ralph Fiennes, UK)
Jealousy (Philippe Garrel, France)
Jimmy P.: Psychotherapy of a Plains Indian (Arnaud Desplechin, France)
The Last of the Unjust (Claude Lanzmann, France/Austria)
Like Father, Like Son (Hirokazu Kore-eda, Japan)
The Missing Picture (Rithy Panh, Cambodia)
My Name Is Hmmm... (Agnès b., France)
Nebraska (Alexander Payne, USA)
Nobody's Daughter Haewon (Hong Sang-soo, South Korea)
Norte, the End of History (Lav Diaz, Philippines)
Omar (Hany Abu-Assad, Palestine)
Only Lovers Left Alive (Jim Jarmusch, USA)
Real (Kiyoshi Kurosawa, Japan)
The Square (Jehane Noujaim, USA/Egypt)
Stranger by the Lake (Alain Guiraudie, France)
Stray Dogs (Tsai Ming-liang, Taiwan/France)
A Touch of Sin (Jia Zhangke, China)
Le Week-End (Roger Michell, UK)
When Evening Falls on Bucharest or Metabolism (Corneliu Porumboiu, Romania/France)
The Wind Rises (Hayao Miyazaki, Japan)

Films at the 52nd New York Film Festival (2014) 

Opening Night: Gone Girl (David Fincher, USA)
Centerpiece: Inherent Vice (Paul Thomas Anderson, USA)
Closing Night: Birdman, or (The Unexpected Virtue of Ignorance) (Alejandro González Iñárritu, USA)
Beloved Sisters (Dominik Graf, Germany/Austria)
The Blue Room (Mathieu Amalric, France)
Citizenfour (Laura Poitras, USA/Germany)
Clouds of Sils Maria (Olivier Assayas, Switzerland/Germany/France)
Eden (Mia Hansen-Løve, France)
Foxcatcher (Bennett Miller, USA)
Goodbye to Language (Jean-Luc Godard, France)
Heaven Knows What (Josh & Benny Safdie, USA)
Hill of Freedom (Hong Sang-soo, South Korea)
Horse Money (Pedro Costa, Portugal)
Jauja (Lisandro Alonso, Argentina/Denmark/France/Mexico/USA/Germany/Brazil)
Life of Riley (Alain Resnais, France)
Listen Up Philip (Alex Ross Perry, USA)
Maps to the Stars (David Cronenberg, Canada/Germany)
Misunderstood (Asia Argento, Italy/France)
Mr. Turner (Mike Leigh, UK)
Pasolini (Abel Ferrara, France/Belgium/Italy)
The Princess of France (Matías Piñeiro, Argentina)
Saint Laurent (Bertrand Bonello, France)
La Sapienza (Eugène Green, France/Italy)
'71 (Yann Demange, UK)
Tales of the Grim Sleeper (Nick Broomfield, USA/UK)
Timbuktu (Abderrahmane Sissako, France/Mauritania)
Time out of Mind (Oren Moverman, USA)
Two Days, One Night (Jean-Pierre & Luc Dardenne, Belgium/France/Italy)
Two Shots Fired (Martín Rejtman, Argentina)
Whiplash (Damien Chazelle, USA)
The Wonders (Alice Rohrwacher, Italy/Switzerland/Germany)

Films at the 53rd New York Film Festival (2015) 

Opening Night: The Walk (Robert Zemeckis, USA)
Centerpiece: Steve Jobs (Danny Boyle, USA)
Closing Night: Miles Ahead (Don Cheadle, USA)
Arabian Nights: Volume One, The Restless One (Miguel Gomes, Portugal/France/Germany/Switzerland)
Arabian Nights: Volume Two, The Desolate One (Miguel Gomes, Portugal/France/Germany/Switzerland)
Arabian Nights: Volume Three, The Enchanted One (Miguel Gomes, Portugal/France/Germany/Switzerland)
The Assassin (Hou Hsiao-hsien, Taiwan/China/Hong Kong)
Bridge of Spies (Steven Spielberg, USA)
Brooklyn (John Crowley, UK/Ireland/Canada)
Carol (Todd Haynes, USA)
Cemetery of Splendour (Apichatpong Weerasethakul, Thailand/UK/France/Germany/Malaysia)
Les Cowboys (Thomas Bidegain, France)
Don't Blink – Robert Frank (Laura Israel, USA/Canada)
Experimenter: The Stanley Milgram Story (Michael Almereyda, USA)
The Forbidden Room (Guy Maddin, Canada)
In the Shadow of Women (Philippe Garrel, France)
Journey to the Shore (Kiyoshi Kurosawa, Japan/France)
The Lobster (Yorgos Lanthimos, France/Netherlands/Greece/UK)
Maggie's Plan (Rebecca Miller, USA)
The Measure of a Man (Stéphane Brizé, France)
Mia Madre (Nanni Moretti, Italy/France)
Microbe & Gasoline (Michel Gondry, France)
Mountains May Depart (Jia Zhangke, China/France/Japan)
My Golden Days (Arnaud Desplechin, France)
No Home Movie (Chantal Akerman, Belgium/France)
Right Now, Wrong Then (Hong Sang-soo, South Korea)
The Treasure (Corneliu Porumboiu, Romania)
Where to Invade Next (Michael Moore, USA)

Films at the 54th New York Film Festival (2016) 

Opening Night: 13th (Ava DuVernay, USA)
Centerpiece: 20th Century Women (Mike Mills, USA)
Closing Night: The Lost City of Z (James Gray, USA)
Aquarius (Kleber Mendonça Filho, Brazil/France)
Certain Women (Kelly Reichardt, USA)
Elle (Paul Verhoeven, France/Germany)
Fire at Sea (Gianfranco Rosi, Italy/France)
Graduation (Cristian Mungiu, Romania)
Hermia & Helena (Matías Piñeiro, Argentina/USA)
I, Daniel Blake (Ken Loach, UK)
Julieta (Pedro Almodóvar, Spain)
Manchester By The Sea (Kenneth Lonergan, USA)
Moonlight (Barry Jenkins, USA)
My Entire High School Sinking into the Sea (Dash Shaw, USA)
Neruda (Pablo Larraín, Chile/Argentina/France/Spain)
Paterson (Jim Jarmusch, USA)
Personal Shopper (Olivier Assayas, France)
The Rehearsal (Alison Maclean, New Zealand)
Sieranevada (Cristi Puiu, Romania)
The Son of Joseph (Eugène Green, France/Belgium)
Staying Vertical (Alain Guiraudie, France)
Things to Come (Mia Hansen-Løve, France/Germany)
Toni Erdmann (Maren Ade, Germany)
The Unknown Girl (Jean-Pierre & Luc Dardenne, Belgium)
Yourself and Yours (Hong Sang-soo, South Korea)

Films at the 55th New York Film Festival (2017) 

Opening Night: Last Flag Flying (Richard Linklater, USA)
Centerpiece: Wonderstruck (Todd Haynes, USA)
Closing Night: Wonder Wheel (Woody Allen, USA)
Before We Vanish (Kiyoshi Kurosawa, Japan)
BPM (Beats per Minute) (Robin Campillo, France)
Call Me by Your Name (Luca Guadagnino, Italy/France)
The Day After (Hong Sang-soo, South Korea)
Faces Places (Agnès Varda, France)
Félicité (Alain Gomis, France/Senegal/Belgium/Germany/Lebanon)
The Florida Project (Sean Baker, USA)
Ismael's Ghosts (Arnaud Desplechin, France)
Lady Bird (Greta Gerwig, USA)
Let the Sunshine In (Claire Denis, France)
Lover for a Day (Philippe Garrel, France)
The Meyerowitz Stories (New and Selected) (Noah Baumbach, USA)
Mrs. Hyde (Serge Bozon, France)
Mudbound (Dee Rees, USA)
On the Beach at Night Alone (Hong Sang-soo, South Korea)
The Other Side of Hope (Aki Kaurismäki, Finland)
The Rider (Chloé Zhao, USA)
Spoor (Agnieszka Holland, Poland/Germany/Czech Republic)
The Square (Ruben Östlund, Sweden)
Thelma (Joachim Trier, Norway/Sweden/France)
Western (Valeska Grisebach, Germany/Bulgaria)
Zama (Lucrecia Martel, Argentina/Brazil/Spain)

Films at the 56th New York Film Festival (2018) 

Opening Night: The Favourite (Yorgos Lanthimos, Ireland/UK/US)
Centerpiece: Roma (Alfonso Cuarón, Mexico)
Closing Night: At Eternity's Gate (Julian Schnabel, US/France)
3 Faces (Jafar Panahi, Iran)
Asako I & II (Ryūsuke Hamaguchi, Japan/France)
Ash Is Purest White (Jia Zhangke, China)
The Ballad of Buster Scruggs (Joel Coen & Ethan Coen, USA)
Burning (Lee Chang-dong, South Korea)
Cold War (Paweł Pawlikowski, Poland)
A Faithful Man (Louis Garrel, France)
A Family Tour (Ying Liang, Taiwan/Hong Kong/Singapore/Malaysia)
La Flor (Mariano Llinás, Argentina)
Grass (Hong Sang-soo, South Korea)
Happy as Lazzaro (Alice Rohrwacher, Italy)
Her Smell (Alex Ross Perry, USA)
High Life (Claire Denis, Germany/France/USA/UK/Poland)
Hotel by the River (Hong Sang-soo, South Korea)
If Beale Street Could Talk (Barry Jenkins, USA)
The Image Book (Jean-Luc Godard, Switzerland)
In My Room (Ulrich Köhler, Germany)
Long Day's Journey Into Night (Bi Gan, China/France)
Monrovia, Indiana (Frederick Wiseman, USA)
Non-Fiction (Olivier Assayas, France)
Private Life (Tamara Jenkins, USA)
Ray & Liz (Richard Billingham, UK)
Shoplifters (Hirokazu Kore-eda, Japan)
Sorry Angel (Christophe Honoré, France)
Too Late to Die Young (Dominga Sotomayor Castillo, Chile/Brazil/Argentina/Netherlands/Qatar)
Transit (Christian Petzold, Germany/France)
Wildlife (Paul Dano, USA)

Films at the 57th New York Film Festival (2019) 

 Opening Night: The Irishman (Martin Scorsese, US)
 Centerpiece: Marriage Story (Noah Baumbach, US)
 Closing Night: Motherless Brooklyn (Edward Norton, US)
Atlantics (Mati Diop, France/Senegal/Belgium)
Bacurau (Kleber Mendonça Filho & Juliano Dornelles, Brazil)
Beanpole (Kantemir Balagov, Russia)
Fire Will Come (Oliver Laxe, Spain/France/Luxembourg)
First Cow (Kelly Reichardt, USA)
A Girl Missing (Kōji Fukada, Japan)
I Was at Home, but... (Angela Schanelec, Germany)
Liberté (Albert Serra, France/Portugal/Spain)
Martin Eden (Pietro Marcello, Italy)
The Moneychanger (Federico Veiroj, Uruguay)
Oh Mercy! (Arnaud Desplechin, France)
Pain and Glory (Pedro Almodóvar, Spain)
Parasite (Bong Joon-ho, South Korea)
Portrait of a Lady on Fire (Céline Sciamma, France)
Saturday Fiction (Lou Ye, China)
Sibyl (Justine Triet, France/Belgium)
Synonyms (Nadav Lapid, France/Israel/Germany)
To the Ends of the Earth (Kiyoshi Kurosawa, Japan)
The Traitor (Marco Bellocchio, Italy)
Varda by Agnès (Agnès Varda, France)
Vitalina Varela (Pedro Costa, Portugal)
Wasp Network (Olivier Assayas, France/Spain/Brazil)
The Whistlers (Corneliu Porumboiu, Romania)
The Wild Goose Lake (Diao Yinan, China/France)
Young Ahmed (Jean-Pierre & Luc Dardenne, Belgium)
Zombi Child (Bertrand Bonello, France)

Films at the 58th New York Film Festival (2020) 

 Opening Night: Lovers Rock (Steve McQueen, United Kingdom)
 Centerpiece: Nomadland (Chloé Zhao, US)
 Closing Night: French Exit (Azael Jacobs, UK/Canada)
Atarrabi and Mikelats (Eugène Green, Belgium/France)
Beginning  (Déa Kulumbegashvili, Georgia)
The Calming  (Song Fang, China)
City Hall (Frederick Wiseman, US)
Days (Tsai Ming-liang, Taiwan)
The Disciple (Chaitanya Tamhane, India)
Gunda (Viktor Kossakovsky, US/Norway)
I Carry You With Me (Heidi Ewing, US/Mexico)
Isabella (Matías Piñeiro, Argentina)
Malmkrog (Cristi Puiu, Romania)
Mangrove (Steve McQueen, UK)
MLK/FBI (Sam Pollard, US)
Night of the Kings (Philippe Lacôte, France/Côte d'Ivoire/Canada/Senegal)
Notturno (Gianfranco Rosi, Italy)
Red, White & Blue (Steve McQueen, UK)
The Salt of Tears (Philippe Garrel, France)
Swimming Out Till the Sea Turns Blue (Jia Zhangke, China)
Time (Garrett Bradley, US)
Tragic Jungle (Yulene Olaizola, Mexico)
The Truffle Hunters (Michael Dweck & Gregory Kershaw, US/Greece/Italy)
Undine (Christian Petzold, Germany)
The Woman Who Ran (Hong Sang-soo, South Korea)

Films at the 59th New York Film Festival (2021) 

 Opening Night: The Tragedy of Macbeth (Joel Coen, US)
 Centerpiece: The Power of the Dog (Jane Campion, Australia/Canada/New Zealand/UK/US)
 Closing Night: Parallel Mothers (Pedro Almodóvar, Spain)
A Chiara (Jonas Carpignano, Italy/France/US/Sweden)
Ahed's Knee (Nadav Lapid, Israel/France/Germany)
Bad Luck Banging or Loony Porn (Radu Jude, Romania)
Benedetta (Paul Verhoeven, France/Netherlands)
Bergman Island (Mia Hansen-Løve, France/Mexico/Brazil/Germany)
Il Buco (Michelangelo Frammartino, Italy/Germany/France)
Drive My Car, (Ryusuke Hamaguchi, Japan)
The First 54 Years: An Abbreviated Manual for Military Occupation (Avi Mograbo, Israel)
Flee (Jonas Poher Rasmussen, Denmark/US/UK/France/Sweden/Norway)
France (Bruno Dumont, France)
Futura (Pietro Marcello, Francesco Munzi, Alice Rohrwacher)
The Girl and the Spider, (Ramon and Silvan Zürcher, Sweden)
Hit the Road (Panah Panahi, Iran)
In Front of Your Face (Hong Sang-soo, South Korea)
Întregalde (Radu Muntean, Romania)
Introduction (Hong Sang-soo, South Korea)
Memoria (Apichatpong Weerasethakul, Colombia, France, Germany, Mexico, Thailand, United Kingdom)
Neptune Frost (Saul Williams, Anisia Uzeyman, Rwanda, US)
Passing (Rebecca Hall, US/UK)
Petite Maman (Céline Sciamma, France)
Prayers for the Stolen (Tatiana Huezo, Mexico)
The Souvenir Part II (Joanna Hogg, US/UK/Ireland)
Titane (Julia Ducournau, France/Belgium)
Unclenching the Fists (Kira Kovalenko, Russia)
The Velvet Underground (Todd Haynes, US)
Vortex (Gaspar Noé, France)
What Do We See When We Look at the Sky? (Alexander Koberidze, Georgia)
Wheel of Fortune and Fantasy (Ryusuke Hamaguchi, Japan)
The Worst Person in the World (Joachim Trier, Norway, Sweden, France)

References 

New York Film Festival
New York Film Festival